The Supreme Court of Justice (STJ) is the highest court of law in Portugal without prejudice to the jurisdiction of the Constitutional Court.

The judges of the STJ are referred to as "counselors" (conselheiros). Its president is elected by and from among the judges of the court.

The STJ is installed in the buildings of the northern wing of the Terreiro do Paço square in Lisbon.

Competences
The competences of the Supreme Court of Justice are the following:
To try the President of Portugal, the President of the Assembly of the Republic and the Prime Minister of Portugal for crimes committed during the exercise of their office;
To harmonize rulings by setting uniform jurisprudence;
To hear appeals in matters of law;
To try crimes committed by the members of the Supreme Court, of the Courts of Appeal or Public Prosecutors.

History
The Supreme Court of Justice was created in 1833, in the scope of the separation of the judicial power from the others, dictated by the establishment of the Portuguese Constitutional Monarchy.

The STJ replaced the ancient higher courts of the kingdom, namely the Board of Conscience and Orders (Mesa da Consciência e Ordens) created in 1532, the Desembargo of the Palace (Desembargo do Paço) regulated in 1533 and the Council of State (Conselho de Estado) regulated in 1562. The judges of the STJ inherited the title of "counselors" until then worn by the members of the Board of Conscience and Orders and of the Council of State.

See also
Judiciary of Portugal
Constitutional Court of Portugal
Portuguese Court of Audits
Portuguese Supreme Administrative Court
Politics of Portugal
Constitution of Portugal

References

External links

Portugal
Politics of Portugal
Law of Portugal
Justice
Courts and tribunals with year of establishment missing